James Michael Pouncey (born July 24, 1989) is an American former professional football player who was a center for ten seasons in the National Football League (NFL). He played college football for the University of Florida, was a member of a BCS National Championship team, and earned All-American honors. He was drafted by the Miami Dolphins in the first round of the 2011 NFL Draft, and played the final three seasons of his career with the Los Angeles Chargers. He is the twin brother of former NFL center Maurkice Pouncey.

Early years
Pouncey was born in Ardmore, Oklahoma.  He attended Lakeland High School in Lakeland, Florida, where he was a standout lineman for the Lakeland Dreadnaughts high school football team. As a senior in 2006, he helped lead Lakeland High to its third consecutive Florida Class 5A state championship and second straight USA Today national championship.

Considered a four-star recruit by Rivals.com, Pouncey was listed as the No. 16 offensive guard in the nation in 2007.  He chose Florida over offers from Florida State, Clemson, Miami, and Michigan.

College career
Pouncey accepted an athletic scholarship to attend the University of Florida in Gainesville, Florida, where he played for coach Urban Meyer's Florida Gators football team from 2007 to 2010.  As a freshman in 2007, he started the season as an offensive lineman but had to move to the defensive line as replacement when several defensive starters were injured.

Pouncey started four of 13 games as a freshman, recording eight tackles and an interception.  As a sophomore in 2008, he moved back to the offensive line and started all 14 of the Gators' games at right guard, including the Gators' 24–14 victory over the Oklahoma Sooners in the 2009 BCS National Championship Game.

After his junior season in 2009, Pouncey was named an Associated Press honorable mention All-Southeastern Conference (SEC) selection and a Pro Football Weekly first-team All-American.  As a senior team captain in 2010, he moved from guard to center for the Gators, replacing his twin brother Maurkice Pouncey at center, after Maurkice entered the 2010 NFL Draft following his junior year.

Professional career

Miami Dolphins

Pouncey graded out as the top center and guard prospects in the 2011 NFL Draft. He was selected by the Miami Dolphins in the first round with the 15th pick overall, and started all 16 regular season games of his rookie season.

In February 2014, the NFL released the "Wells Report" finding that Pouncey, along with Dolphins teammates Richie Incognito and John Jerry, had bullied and harassed lineman Jonathan Martin, another unnamed player, and an assistant trainer.  The harassment of the assistant trainer, in which Pouncey took part, included racial insults.

On April 29, 2014, the Dolphins exercised the fifth year option on his rookie contract. Pouncey underwent hip surgery to repair a torn labrum with an expected recovery time of three months on June 23. He would go on to play the entire 2014 season at Guard and was named to his second Pro Bowl, becoming the third Dolphin in team history to earn Pro Bowl honors at two different positions (Cameron Wake, Randy Starks).

On April 10, 2015, Pouncey signed a 5-year contract extension with the Dolphins worth $52.15 million with $22 million guaranteed. Pouncey only played in five games in 2016 after dealing with a hip injury before being placed on injured reserve on December 13, 2016.

The Dolphins released Pouncey on March 15, 2018, after he asked the team to release him.

Los Angeles Chargers
On March 19, 2018, Pouncey signed a two-year, $15 million contract including $10 million fully guaranteed with the Los Angeles Chargers. He started all 16 games at center for the Chargers in 2018, on his way to his fourth Pro Bowl.

On September 3, 2019, Pouncey signed a one-year extension worth $9 million. He was placed on injured reserve on October 9, 2019 with a neck injury.

On September 17, 2020, Pouncey was placed on injured reserve after undergoing season-ending hip surgery.

On February 12, 2021, Pouncey announced his retirement, alongside his brother, after a ten-season career.

Personal life
Pouncey's identical twin brother Maurkice Pouncey was selected 18th overall by the Pittsburgh Steelers in the 2010 NFL Draft.  He is one minute older than Maurkice.  Pouncey has two children: a daughter, Janiyah (born 2008), and a son, Kayden (born 2013).

See also
 2008 Florida Gators football team
 List of Florida Gators football All-Americans
 List of Florida Gators in the NFL Draft
 List of Miami Dolphins first-round draft picks
 List of Miami Dolphins players

References

External links

 
 Florida Gators bio
 Miami Dolphins profile
 Los Angeles Chargers bio

1989 births
Living people
American twins
Twin sportspeople
People from Ardmore, Oklahoma
Sportspeople from Lakeland, Florida
Players of American football from Oklahoma
African-American players of American football
American football centers
American football offensive guards
Lakeland High School (Lakeland, Florida) alumni
Florida Gators football players
All-American college football players
Miami Dolphins players
Los Angeles Chargers players
Unconferenced Pro Bowl players
21st-century African-American sportspeople
20th-century African-American people
American Conference Pro Bowl players
Ed Block Courage Award recipients